Melvin Wandelaar (born 2 January 1990) is a Dutch footballer who plays for SV Robinhood of the Surinamese Hoofdklasse.

References 

1990 births
Living people
Dutch footballers
Dutch expatriate footballers
Expatriate footballers in Suriname
S.V. Robinhood players
SVB Eerste Divisie players
Sportspeople from Vlissingen
Association football midfielders
Vv Hoogeveen players
Dutch expatriate sportspeople in Suriname
Footballers from Zeeland
TOP Oss players